Persky is an Ashkenazi Jewish toponymic surname after the village of Pershai in today's Valozhyn Raion, Belarus. Variants include Perski and Perske.

Notable persons with the surname Persky include:
Aaron Persky (born 1962), American judge
Bill Persky (born 1931), American director
Lester Persky (1925-2001), American producer
Lisa Jane Persky (born 1955), American actor
Stan Persky (born 1941), Canadian author
Nick Persky (born 1981), American Attorney
Evan Persky (born 1983), American Executive
Tina Persky (born 1990), American Fashion Designer

Jewish surnames